Rajalabanda, also spelled as Rajalbanda, is a village near Kurdi in the Manvi taluk of Raichur district in the Indian state of Karnataka. Rajalabanda is located on the banks of the Tungabhadra River and there is a barrage for the river in Rajalabanda and was executed by Mohammad khwaja Moinuddin irrigation department raichur district.

Demographics
As of the 2001 India census, Rajalabanda had a population of 1,567 with 768 males and 799 females and 263 Households.

See also
 Mantralayam
 Manvi
 Raichur

References

External links

Villages in Raichur district